Jacques Lacombe,  (born July 14, 1963 in Cap-de-la-Madeleine, Quebec) is a Canadian conductor.

Lacombe began his musical learning with choral singing.  He later trained as an organist, and continued his studies at the Conservatoire de musique du Québec à Montréal and at the Hochschule für Musik in Vienna. He was assistant conductor of the Montreal Symphony Orchestra from 1994 to 1998, and later its principal guest conductor from 2002 to 2006.  He was chief conductor and music director of Les Grands Ballets Canadiens from 1990 to 2003.  He became music director of the Orchestre symphonique de Trois-Rivières (Trois-Rivières Symphony Orchestra) in 2006, and held the post through the close of the 2017-2018 season.  In Europe, Lacombe was music director of the Philharmonie de Lorraine in Metz, France from 1998 to 2001.

In November 2008, Lacombe guest-conducted the New Jersey Symphony Orchestra (NJSO) for the first time.  This appearance led to his appointment in October 2009 as the NJSO's 13th music director, effective with the 2010-2011 season.  Lacombe held the title of music director designate for the 2009-2010 season.  His initial contract as music director was for 3 years.  In July 2012, the NJSO announced the extension of Lacombe's contract as music director through the 2015-2016 season. He ended his tenure with the NJSO at the conclusion of the 2015-2016 season. Composer Darryl Kubian dedicated his new composition O For a Muse of Fire to Lacombe and the New Jersey Symphony Orchestra, who premiered the work in March 2015.

In August 2015, the Theater Bonn announced the appointment of Lacombe as the new chief conductor of Bonn Opera, effective with the 2016-2017 season, with an initial contract of 2 years.  In June 2017, the Orchestre symphonique de Mulhouse announced the appointment of Lacombe as its next music director and artistic director, effective September 1, 2018.

Lacombe and his wife Janet, who first met in 2003, married in 2004.  Lacombe was made a Knight of the National Order of Quebec in 2012, and a Member of the Order of Canada the following year.

References

External links
 Jacques Lacombe official website
 Orchestre symphonique de Trois-Rivières French-language biography 
 Colbert Artists Management Inc.
 Marie-Thérèse Norris, 'Married to the Maestro – the Prelude'.  The French Touch blog, 27 March 2012 

1963 births
Living people
Members of the Order of Canada
Male conductors (music)
Conservatoire de musique du Québec à Montréal alumni
Knights of the National Order of Quebec
People from Mauricie
21st-century Canadian conductors (music)
21st-century Canadian male musicians